A referendum on reducing the term length of Parliament from five to four years was held in the Cook Islands on 16 June 1999. The proposal would amend article 37 of the constitution, which at the time read  "The Queen's Representative shall dissolve Parliament at the expiration of 5 years from the date of the last preceding general election, if it has not sooner been dissolved." The change was approved by 64.5% of voters, but this was below the two-thirds majority required to modify the constitution. A second referendum in 2004 was passed by the majority required.

Results

References

Parliamentary
Cook Islands
Referendums in the Cook Islands
Cook Islands
Election and referendum articles with incomplete results